The Nippon Express Workers' Union (NEU, Zennittsu) is a trade union representing workers at Nippon Express in Japan.

The union was founded in 1946, and initially had 120,000 members.  It affiliated to Sanbetsu, then to the General Council of Trade Unions of Japan, and by 1967 its membership had fallen to 71,596.  The following year, it became part of the All Japan Federation of Transport Workers' Unions, to which it remains affiliated.

External links

References

Trade unions established in 1946
Trade unions in Japan
Transportation trade unions